Unknown film may refer to
Unknown (2006 film),  crime thriller starring James Caviezel
Unknown (2011 film), thriller starring Liam Neeson
 A lost film

See also
Unknown (disambiguation)#Film